West Keal is a village and civil parish  east of Lincoln, in the East Lindsey district, in the county of Lincolnshire, England. The parish includes the hamlet of Keal Cotes. In 2011 the parish had a population of 327. The parish touches Bolingbroke, East Keal, East Kirkby, Mavis Enderby, Raithby and Stickford.

Landmarks 
There are 7 listed buildings in West Keal. West Keal has a church called St Helen's Church.

History 
The name "Keal" means 'Ridge(s)'. West Keal was recorded in the Domesday Book as Cale/Westrecale.

References

External links 
 Parish council

Villages in Lincolnshire
Civil parishes in Lincolnshire
East Lindsey District